Hamadruas is a genus of Asian lynx spiders that was first described by Christa Laetitia Deeleman-Reinhold in 2009.

Species
 it contains nine species with an Indo-Malayan distribution:
Hamadruas austera (Thorell, 1894) – Singapore
Hamadruas heterosticta (Pocock, 1897) – Indonesia (Sulawesi, Moluccas)
Hamadruas hieroglyphica (Thorell, 1887) (type) – China, Myanmar
Hamadruas insulana (Thorell, 1891) – India (Nicobar Is.)
Hamadruas pupulus (Thorell, 1890) – Indonesia (Nias Is.)
Hamadruas severa (Thorell, 1895) – Myanmar, Indonesia (Lombok)
Hamadruas signifera (Doleschall, 1859) – Indonesia (Java)
Hamadruas sikkimensis (Tikader, 1970) – India, Bangladesh, China
Hamadruas superba (Thorell, 1887) – Myanmar, Thailand, Indonesia (Borneo)

See also
 List of Oxyopidae species

References

Araneomorphae genera
Arthropods of Indonesia
Fauna of Malaysia
Oxyopidae
Spiders of Asia